"We Didn't Start the Fire" is a 1989 song by the American singer-songwriter Billy Joel.

We Didn't Start the Fire may also refer to:

"We Didn't Start the Fire" (Grey's Anatomy), a 2019 episode of the television series
We Didn't Start the Fire (podcast), a modern history podcast